Brooking is a surname. Notable people with the surname include:

Charles Brooking (c. 1723–1759), English painter
Christopher Brooking, English politician
Keith Brooking (born 1975), American football player
Patrick Brooking (1937–2014), British Army general
Trevor Brooking (born 1948), English footballer and manager
Stephen J A Brooking (born 1964), UK and United Nations diplomat

See also
Brookings (surname)
Brooking, Saskatchewan